Vijayawada Metro is proposed  light rail transit system in the Indian city of Vijayawada. The system is proposed to reduce traffic congestion in the city and consists three corridors which will construct in 3 Phases. Phase-I covering 24.5 km, phase-ll covering 12.50 Km, phase-lll covering 28 km. The project was estimated approximately ₹15,000 crore. It was proposed in the form of light Metro which consists of 3 coaches.

History 
The Metro rail project is proposed by N Chandrababu Naidu to reduce traffic congestion in the city. The project was awarded to E.Sreedharan led Delhi Metro Rail Corporation (DMRC), keeping in view its successful execution of the Delhi Metro Rail project. Survey work for the project began in 2014. RVR Associates was appointed to conduct household and traffic surveys. Following the completion of these two surveys, topographical, environmental and soil surveys were also conducted. A detailed project report on the Vijayawada Metro was submitted by Principal Advisor of DMRC, E.Sreedharan to the Chief Minister. There is no scope for metro in vijayawada and traffic issues has to be more concentrated. N Chandrababu Naidu on April 27, 2015.

The AMRC floated tenders for the construction of two lines for the project on 28 November 2016. Larsen and Toubro (L&T), Afcons Infrastructure Limited (AIL), and Simplex Infrastructures Limited (SIL) submitted bids for the project.

DMRC had been asked to complete phase-1 of the project by December 2018.

The project has been shelved due the Government of Andhra Pradesh's failure to submit its revised proposals in line with Metro Rail Policy-2017

Network 
The total length of alignment in 3 directions would be 66 km, as per the details mentioned below.

Special purpose vehicle 
The metro project is implemented by a special purpose vehicle named as, Amaravati Metro Rail Corporation. Amaravati Metro Rail Corporation has been renamed as Andhra Pradesh Metro Rail Corporation Ltd after the Managing Director of AMRC suggested that it might be appropriate to change the name AMRC as APMRC so as to implement the Metro Projects in other parts of the State and the ruling government obliged.

Plan 
As Ex-CM N Chandrababu Naidu planned a new capital for Andhra Pradesh, he planned to develop Vijayawada as a smart city & rolled out plans for metro in the city.

Network and route 
The proposed interchange of two lines is Pandit Nehru Bus Station (PNBS), a bus station located at the southern side of Vijayawada city and beside the Krishna River. The proposed first line will follow Bandar Road from Pandit Nehru Bus Station to Penamaluru via Mahatma Gandhi road and the second run from PNBS along Eluru Road to Vijayawada Airport via Vijayawada Railway Station. An extension to Amaravati (state capital) is proposed in a subsequent phase. The project does not serve One Town area, where commercial locations such as KR Market, Vastralatha and the temple of Kanaka Durga are located.

Funding 
The corridor from Pandit Nehru Bus Station (PNBS) to Nidamanur is estimated to cost , and the corridor between PNBS and Penamalur will cost .

The Andhra Pradhesh Government had previously considered taking a loan from JICA, but chose not to, as JICA's loan proposal mandated that 30% of the loaned amount should used to procure rolling stock from Japan.

References 

Rail transport in Andhra Pradesh
Proposed rapid transit in India
Transport in Vijayawada
Airport rail links in India
Standard gauge railways in India
Proposed infrastructure in Andhra Pradesh